Acanthogonatus alegre is a mygalomorph spider of Chile, its name using the Spanish word for “happy”, referring to the aspect of a happy face that the female epigastrium has in posterior view. Females are recognized by the epigastrium produced in a membranous extension and the long, slender and bifurcated spermathecae.

Description
Female: total length ; cephalothorax length , width ; cephalic region length , width ; fovea width ; medial ocular quadrangle length , width ; labium length , width ; sternum length , width . Its cephalic region is flat, low and narrow, with its fovea slightly procurved and with a small posterior notch. Its labium possesses 1 cuspule. A well-developed serrula is present. Its sternal sigilla is oval, elongated, small and shallow; its sternum is rebordered. Chelicerae: rastellum is absent. Its spermathecae has a conspicuous epigastric projection. Its cephalothorax, legs and chelicerae are an olive brown colour with golden hairs, while its abdomen is lighter, with a darker chevron similar to the one in A. campanae.

Distribution
Known only from its type locality: Antofagasta, (Region II) Chile.

See also
Spider anatomy
Regions of Chile

References

External links

 ADW entry

ZipcodeZoo entry

Pycnothelidae
Spiders of South America
Spiders described in 1995
Endemic fauna of Chile